The Morgan Super 3 is a three-wheeled roadster produced by the British car manufacturer Morgan.

History
After production of the previous 3-Wheeler model was discontinued at the end of 2021, Morgan presented the Super 3 on 24 February 2022. It is available in Europe and the United States. The vehicle is built in Malvern, Worcestershire, England.

Specifications
The Super 3 is based the CX-Generation platform used in the Plus Four and Plus Six. Compared to the previous model, the chassis increases stability and allow additional space for the passengers.

Only two small windshields serve as wind protection for the passengers. A soft top is not available. All assemblies in the cockpit should be dustproof and protected against splash water according to IP64. The seats are permanently installed; The pedals and the steering column can be adjusted to adapt the seating position to the driver. Fully digital instruments with a classic look are installed in the cockpit.

The engine is longitudinally installed and hidden under a bonnet opposite the 3-wheeler. The rear wheel is also driven. The 5-speed manual transmission comes from the Mazda MX-5.

References

External links
Morgan Motor Company page

Super 3
Cars introduced in 2022
Three-wheeled motor vehicles
Roadsters